Raj Chandarlapaty (born May 12, 1970) is an American educator and author. Chandarlapaty is a product of the American philological tradition and has researched the contributions of Jack Kerouac and William S. Burroughs. His archival research, including previously unconsidered letters, "places them and their work in a context much larger and diverse than heretofore considered."

Early life and career
Chandarlapaty graduated in 2003 with his PhD in English from the University of South Florida. While the teaching career that followed took him from Florida to Texas to Afghanistan, Chandarlapaty maintained a close relationship with his mentor at USF, Phillip Sipiora. This included writing a number of scholarly articles for The Mailer Review, an annual collection of works about author Norman Mailer that Sipiora edited. He has since published widely on Mailer, Burroughs, Allen Ginsberg, James Baldwin, David Woodard, and Mohamed Mrabet, among other subjects. Chandarlapaty taught at University of Miami, Florida International University, University of Texas Rio Grande Valley, and Southern University, as well as Florida Memorial University.

Taliban incident
In 2012, Chandarlapaty and his wife Sujatha, also a professor, both took jobs at the American University of Afghanistan in Kabul. On August 24, 2016 suspected Taliban terrorists attacked the campus.

"There was total chaos, we didn't know if we could escape," Chandarlapaty has said. "Many boys jumped from buildings and broke their legs, and they laid there until morning, when medics could rescue them." Nineteen people were killed, including eight students, two professors and six policemen and university security guards. Three terrorists were killed by the Afghan National Army Special Forces.

Chandarlapaty explained in a filmed interview that the attack stemmed from the university's unconscionable lack of security despite clear warnings.

Bibliography
 'The Hipster'.  From McKinley, Maggie, ed, Norman Mailer in Context (New York: Cambridge University Press, 2021), 193-201.

'Seeing the Beat Generation: Entering the Literature through Film] (Jefferson, NC: McFarland & Company, 2019)
 Re-creating Paul Bowles, the Other, and the Imagination: Music, Film, and Photography (London: Lexington Books, 2014)
 The Beat Generation and Counterculture: Paul Bowles, William S. Burroughs, Jack Kerouac (New York: Peter Lang, 2009)
Journal articles
 "Drugs, Depression and Social Change: How Magic Realism Morphed into Social Change in the Writings of Norman Mailer", The Mailer Review, Vol. 10, 2016, pp. 337-349
 "Through the Quintessential Divide: Norman Mailer's Response to Race Theory", The Mailer Review, Vol. 9, 2015, pp. 227-242
 "Teaching Norman Mailer in Afghanistan", The Mailer Review, Vol. 8, 2014, pp. 243-256
 "Dreams, Death and Bottle-Break: Modernist Ethnopoetics and the Beatnik Quest for Ascesis", The Mailer Review, Vol. 7, 2013, pp. 279-293
 "Through the Lens of the Beatniks: Norman Mailer", The Mailer Review, Vol. 5, 2011, pp. 231-247
 "Indian Journals and Allen Ginsberg's Revival as Prophet of Social Revolution", ariel: A Review of International English Literature, Vol. 41, Nr. 2, 2011, pp. 113–138
 "In Defense of Tradition: Mohamed Mrabet's Postcolonial Leanings and the Confrontation of Kif Wisdom with Modernity", Storytelling, Self, Society'', Vol. 3, Nr. 1, 2007

References

Notes

Citations

1970 births
Southern University faculty
American people of Canadian descent
Living people
University of South Florida alumni
20th-century American male writers
20th-century American non-fiction writers
American male non-fiction writers